Carl is an unincorporated community in Nicholas County, in the U.S. state of West Virginia.

History
A post office called Carl was established in 1907, and remained in operation until 1952. The community was named after the child of a local postmaster.

References

Unincorporated communities in Nicholas County, West Virginia
Unincorporated communities in West Virginia